The Caswell Messenger is an American weekly newspaper located in Caswell County, North Carolina, published by the Womack Publishing Company. The paper has been published every Wednesday for over eighty years. The Caswell Messenger focuses on local news in Caswell County, including the communities of Yanceyville, Leasburg, Milton, Semora, Providence, Blanch, Hightowers, Frogsboro, and Ruffin, among others. The Caswell Messenger is the only newspaper in Caswell County, and the county's primary source of news for local government, local sports, and community news. The Caswell Messenger's News Editor is Davin Wilson.

See also
 List of newspapers published in North Carolina

References

External links
The Caswell Messenger
Womack Publishing Company

Weekly newspapers published in North Carolina
Caswell County, North Carolina
Publications with year of establishment missing